United Hebrew Congregation may refer to:

England
 Blackpool United Hebrew Congregation, Blackpool, England
 Newcastle United Hebrew Congregation, in the former Leazes Park Synagogue, Newcastle upon Tyne, England
 United Hebrew Congregation (closed in 2000), Torquay, England

Other places
 United Hebrew Congregation (UHC Singapore), part of the History of the Jews in Singapore

 United Hebrew Congregation (Johannesburg, South Africa); see Oxford Shul

 United Hebrew Congregation (Chesterfield, Missouri), United States

See also
 United Synagogue, a union of British Orthodox Jewish synagogues